The 1976 FIM Motocross World Championship was the 20th F.I.M. Motocross Racing World Championship season.

Summary
Suzuki's Roger De Coster claimed his fifth 500cc world championship finishing ahead of his teammate Gerrit Wolsink and Maico's Adolf Weil. Wolsink had seven moto victories against the nine victories by De Coster meaning that the championship wasn't decided until the final race in Luxembourg. Husqvarna's Heikki Mikkola returned to the 250cc class and won a tight points battle to finish the season one point ahead of KTM's Guennady Moisseev. Gaston Rahier once again dominated the 125cc class to win his second consecutive world championship for Suzuki. Yamaha's team was disbanded with Jaak van Velthoven joining the KTM team and Åke Jonsson returning to his former Maico team while, 250cc rider Håkan Andersson moved to the Montesa factory racing team.

Grands Prix

500cc

250cc

125cc

Final standings

References

External links
 

FIM Motocross World Championship season
Motocross World Championship seasons